Mississauga East—Cooksville is a federal electoral district in Ontario, Canada, that has been represented in the House of Commons of Canada since 2004.

History
It was created in 2003 from parts of Mississauga Centre and Mississauga East ridings.

Following the 2012 redistribution, the riding will include parts of Mississauga—Brampton South and Mississauga South for the next election. The northern Burnhamthorpe boundary would change to Eglinton. This would mean that Rockwood Village would move from Mississauga—Brampton South to the "Mississauga East-Cooksville" riding.

It consisted of the part of the City of Mississauga east of a line drawn from north to south along the Queensway, Mavis Road, Central Parkway East, HWY 403 and Eglington Avenue East. It includes the neighbourhood of Cooksville, from which the riding derives part of its name.

For the 2015 Federal Election, Elections Canada describes the riding as follows: 
"Consisting of that part of the Regional Municipality of Peel  that part of the City of Mississauga described as follows: commencing at the intersection of the northeasterly limit of said city with Queensway East; thence southwesterly along Queensway East and Queensway West to Mavis Road; thence northwesterly along said road to Central Parkway West; thence northeasterly and northwesterly along said parkway and Central Parkway East to Highway No. 403; thence northeasterly and northwesterly along said highway to Eglinton Avenue East; thence northeasterly along said avenue to the northeasterly limit of said city; thence generally southeasterly along said limit to the point of commencement."

Demographics 
According to the 2021 Canada Census

Ethnic groups: 48.5% White, 16.3% South Asian, 7.4% Filipino, 6.4% Black, 4.3% Chinese, 4.2% Arab, 3.2% Southeast Asian, 2.9% Latin American, 1.2% West Asian

Languages: 39.9% English, 6.5% Polish, 3.6% Tagalog, 3.5% Arabic, 3.5% Urdu, 2.9% Portuguese, 2.9% Ukrainian, 2.8% Spanish, 2.3% Vietnamese, 2.3% Italian, 2.1% Mandarin, 1.6% Tamil, 1.5% Serbian, 1.4% Cantonese, 1.2% Russian

Religions: 60.0% Christian (39.0% Catholic, 5.9% Christian Orthodox, 1.7% Anglican, 1.3% United Church, 1.1% Pentecostal, 11.0% Other), 13.5% Muslim, 6.0% Hindu, 2.3% Buddhist, 1.1% Sikh, 16.5% None

Median income: $37,200 (2020)

Average income: $47,360 (2020)

Riding associations

Riding associations are the local branches of political parties:

Members of Parliament

This riding has elected the following Members of Parliament:

Election results

See also
 List of Canadian federal electoral districts
 Past Canadian electoral districts

References

External links

Riding history from the Library of Parliament
 2011 Results from Elections Canada
 Campaign expense data from Elections Canada
Mississauga News Article on Proposed Electoral Districts August 28, 2012
Electoral Districts - Mississauga–Brampton South – Existing Boundaries
Electoral Districts - Mississauga Centre – Proposed Boundaries
 Electoral Districts - Mississauga East-Cooksville – Existing Boundaries
 Electoral Districts - Mississauga East-Cooksville – Proposed Boundaries
Electoral Districts - Mississauga East - Cooksville - 2014 Electoral Boundaries

Ontario federal electoral districts
Politics of Mississauga
2003 establishments in Ontario